I Wish I Had a Wife is a 2001 South Korean film about a lonely banker who meets a schoolteacher.

Plot
Bong-soo (Sol Kyung-Gu) has been working as manager of a small bank in an apartment complex for three years. During his three years there, 23 years if you count his school days, Bong-soo has never been late. However, he purposely decides to skip work one day. There is only one reason. Inside a subway train that has suddenly stopped on his way to work, everyone around him reaches for their cell phones to call someone. At that moment, he realized that he does not have a single person to call. He does not know that inside the educational center across the street from the bank where he works, a 27-year-old woman Won-ju (Jeon Do-Yeon) is looking over to him, nourishing a small love. Bong-soo and Won-ju run into each other every day, at the Ramen restaurant, at the bank, at the bus station.

All kinds of trivial incidents occur but Bong-soo still does not truly recognize Won-ju's presence. One day, while looking over the bank's CCTV tapes, Bong-soo discovers someone pitifully calling out his name to the small, closed-circuit camera that does not even record sound.

Awards
2001 Baeksang Arts Awards
 Best Actress - Jeon Do-yeon
 Best New Director - Park Heung-sik

References

External links 
 

2001 films
2000s Korean-language films
Films directed by Park Heung-sik (born 1965)
South Korean romantic drama films
2000s South Korean films